Blue Valley High School is a 9-12 public high school in Overland Park, Kansas, United States that was established in 1969. It is operated by Blue Valley USD 229.

Academics

In 1988, and again in 2012, Blue Valley High School was selected as a Blue Ribbon School. The Blue Ribbon Award recognizes public and private schools which perform at high levels or have made significant academic improvements.

Athletics
The Tigers compete in the Eastern Kansas League and are classified as a 6A school according to the KSHSAA. Throughout its history, Blue Valley has won 49 state championships in various sports. Many graduates have gone on to participate in collegiate athletics.

Football
The Blue Valley Tigers have won six state championships, and all six coming in 5A. They have been state runner-ups a total of seven times including twice in 6A in 2015 and 2016 losing to Derby High School both times. They have also won EKL 11 times and have had three undefeated seasons.

Volleyball

The Blue Valley Tigers won their first state volleyball championship in 2019, finishing 1st in 6A without dropping a set at the state tournament. The Tigers finished as the 6A state runner-ups in 2018 and 2022.

State championships

Notable alumni
 Will Brennan, baseball player
 Jason Holsman (class of 1994), Commissioner for the Missouri Public Service Commission, Former member of the Missouri Senate and former chairman of the committee on Renewable Energy for the Missouri House of Representatives.
 Tara Nott (class of 1990), won a gold medal in Olympic weightlifting during the 2000 Summer Olympics.
 Brian Schottenheimer (class of 1992), QB Coach for the Jacksonville Jaguars, son of former NFL coach Marty Schottenheimer, Former Offensive Coordinator Seattle Seahawks
 Ryne Stanek (class of 2010), MLB baseball player
 Michael Stevens (class of 2004), internet personality for YouTube, creator and host of Vsauce
 Justin Swift (class of 1994), former NFL player for the Denver Broncos, San Francisco 49ers and Detroit Lions.
 The Greeting Committee, Indie Rock band

Gallery

See also
 List of high schools in Kansas
 List of unified school districts in Kansas
Other high schools in Blue Valley USD 229 school district
 Blue Valley North High School in Overland Park
 Blue Valley Northwest High School in Overland Park
 Blue Valley West High School in Overland Park
 Blue Valley Southwest High School in Overland Park
 Blue Valley Academy in Overland Park

References

External links

 
 Blue Valley USD 229 school district

Public high schools in Kansas
Schools in Johnson County, Kansas
Educational institutions established in 1969
1969 establishments in Kansas